Jeypore is one of the largest towns and a place of historical significance in Koraput district in the Indian state of Odisha. It was established by Vir Vikram Dev in the mid 17th century. The kingdom was defeated by the East India Company in 1777 who declared it a Zamindari or Feudatory of the British Crown and much later got acknowledged as a Princely state until its dissolution in the Dominion of India in 1947.

The erstwhile kingdom was spread over the region of Uttarandhra and Southern Odisha. Geographically, Jeypore is a hilly region surrounded by Eastern Ghats and the Araku hills on three sides like a horseshoe with the western side opening up to Chhattisgarh in central India.

History
Before getting the name ‘Jeypore’ by the Suryavanshi kings this land was ruled by various dynasties like the Satavahanas, Ikshavakus, Nalas, Gangas and Shilavanshis. In 1443, Vinayak Dev the prince of Northern Kashmir married the only daughter of the Shilavanshi king and inherited the kingdom of Nandapur.  He extended his territory while ruling as a vassal ruler under the Gajapati empire. However, after the decline of the Gajapati dynasty, the then Nandapur ruler Vishwanath Dev claimed sovereignty and began ruling as an independent chief in the South Odisha and North Andhra Pradesh region under the title of “Nauna-Gajapati”.

According to some sources, Vishwanath was able to extend his kingdom from the boundaries of Bengal in North to the coast of Godavari in South. By doing so he rightfully adopted the title of “Gajapati”.

In 1571, after the death of Vishwanath Dev Gajapati, the kingdom under the kinship of his son Balram Dev lost frequent battles to the Qutb Shahi of Golconda and became a tributary kingdom. 

In 1649, Maharaja Veer Vikram Dev abandoned the old capital of Nandapur and founded Jeypore, located amidst hilly ranges and dense forests. It is believed that the continuous intrusion of the Qutb Shahi governor and his military which was weakening the administration of Nandapur forced the king to shift his capital to a strategically viable land. The relationship between Qutb Shahi Sultan and the Maharaja improved significantly in the regime of Veer Vikram. Nevertheless, Krishna Dev, the successor of Veer Vikram, stopped paying tributes to the Golconda Durbar and claimed independence. In 1674, the next ruler, Vishwambhar Dev defeated the Qutb Shahi Governor of Chicacole who administered on behalf of the Sultan of Golconda and re established the control of his family over the North Andhra region up to Godavari. This king is known as the father of the feudal system of Jeypore because he established many zamindaris across the North Andhra and South Odisha region. 

However, the military coup executed by Balram Dev III against his brother Maharaja Ramchandra Dev in 1710 ensured the collapse of the kingdom. Many feudatories of Andhra claimed independence from Jeypore and the kingdom lost a large extent of territory. 

The kingdom faced many challenges but remained sovereign until the advent of the British in 1777. Maharaja Vikram Dev battled the enemies on two fronts but was defeated on both occasions and his kingdom was demoted to a Zamindari for its hostile stance towards the British. 

Under the British, the Anglican Church Mission Society focused on developing hospitals and schools. At the end of the 19th century, missionary activity was overseen by B. Baring-Gould including the development of the Robert Money School.

Even as a zamindari, the growth and development of Jeypore continued in the regime of Maharaja Ramchandra Dev III, Maharaja Vikram Dev III, Maharaja Ramchandra Dev IV and the last official ruler, Maharaja Vikram Deo Verma (Vikram Dev IV). 

In 2013, Vishweshvar Dev was crowned as the pretender Maharaja of Jeypore becoming the twenty-seventh king on the 570th anniversary of the  dynasty.

Education
There are several Odia medium schools in the town such as Government Boys High School, Girls High School, Municipal High School No. I, II and III (girls), Upper Kolab Project High School, Saraswati Sishu vidya mandir, etc. The English medium schools are Modern English School which was established in 1989, Odisha Adarsha Vidyalaya, Jayantigiri, Jeypore which was established by Govt. of Odisha; Jeypore Public school, Deepti Convent School, DAV Model Senior Secondary School, Redwoods English School and Noval Siddharth English Medium School.

Government Colleges include Vikram Deb College, Jeypore, which is one of the oldest and prominent colleges of Odisha established in 1947. The college started at the present P. G. Block was known as 'Jeypore College' from 1 July 1947. As a tribute to the philanthropist king, Rajarshi Vikram Deb Verma, the college was renamed to "Vikram Deb College" in 1961. Honors subjects teaching were imparted from during 1968–73 and Post Graduate courses were started from 1979. The other colleges being Govt. Women's College and Law College. Of late many private colleges have started in the town making the environment highly competitive. Among them, prominent are Narayani Junior College and vidwan institute of basic sciences.

Jeypore also has colleges offering professional courses such as Gopal Krushna College of Engineering & Technology, which was established in the year 1989. Jeypore college of Pharmacy is another renowned pharmacy institute. Along with it various Engineering Diploma colleges are present namely Institute of engineering & Management (I.E.M), Hi-Tech Institute of Information & Technology and Jeypore School of Engineering and Technologies.

Business and economy
Though traditionally an agrarian economy, Jeypore is the business hub for southern Odisha as well as the bordering towns of Andhra Pradesh. There is high potential growth of this town due to high minerals, opportunities, resources around the district adding to all the facilities like rail, air in this town. There are many renowned industries in and around Jeypore. Business units include Sewa Paper Mills, now a part of BILT, and numerous rice & cashew processing units

Transportation

Road
Jeypore is well connected with many cities, including nearby cities lying within its proximity, like Bhubaneswar, Cuttack (both 530 km), Rourkela (575 km), Berhampur (336 km), Jagdalpur (86 km), Sambalpur (394 km), Araku Valley (98 km) and Rayagada (132 km), which include the neighbouring states of Andhra Pradesh and Chhattisgarh, through state and national highways, where daily state and private buses operate to and from the city. The city could be easily reached with the help of NH-26, which passes through it. The under-construction Raipur–Visakhapatnam Expressway will 
pass through Koraput district, thus enhancing connectivity and commute further.

The nearest cities of Andhra Pradesh in proximity to Jeypore are Vizianagaram (165 km), Vishakhapatnam (233 km) and Srikakulam (199 km) and Rajahmundry (345 km), and of Chhattisgarh include Raipur (325 km), Bilaspur (443 km) and Durg (336 km).

Rail
Apart from road, Jeypore is well connected with rail, as the city has a railway station just on its outskirts. There are daily trains to Bhubaneswar, Kolkata and Vishakhapatnam via Araku. A new train with a special coach, known as the Vistadome Coach, a coach made specially for facilitating tourism and enjoyment of tourists by travelling through the Eastern Ghats, has been recently extended from Vishakhapatnam to Jagdalpur via Jeypore.

Air
There is an airport that is run and maintained by the Government of Odisha and the Airports Authority of India. Until October 2022, it was a private airport that was under Hindustan Aeronautics Limited (HAL), when it began operating commercial flights operated by the new low-cost regional airline, IndiaOne Air, to Bhubaneswar and Visakhapatnam.

Politics
After independence, in the first General Election held in 1952, Late Laichan Nayak was elected as the first MLA of Jeypore and reelected for a subsequent term in 1957. Raghunath Patnaik has been elected for 6 times to the state legislative assembly. Rabi Narayan Nanda has been elected for 3 successive terms starting from the assembly elections in 2000. Tara Prasad Bahinipati is the present MLA.

Jeypore is part of Koraput (Lok Sabha constituency).

Notable people
 Biswanath Rath, Film Director, Screenwriter, Editor and Producer

 Manoj Kumar Sahu
 Director in DGCA

External links 

 Jeypore.net

References

Cities and towns in Koraput district
Koraput district